The Taiwan Typhoon and Flood Research Institute (TTFRI) was a research institute which is part of the National Applied Research Laboratories of Taiwan. It was merged into the National Science and Technology Center for Disaster Reduction in 2018.

History
The Taiwan Typhoon and Flood Research Institute was inaugurated in 2011 in the city of Taichung. Lee Cheng-shang was the inaugural Director.

TTFRI is a coordinator of research into quantitative precipitation forecasting.

TTFRI has worked with the Central Weather Bureau to develop a radar assimilation system which has increased the accuracy of the six hour rainfall forecast by twenty percent.

In 2018 TTFRI began a project to improve the flood management of Cayo District in Belize in partnership with the Belizean Government which is one of Taiwan's few remaining official diplomatic allies.

Equipment
In 2015 TTFRI acquired a set of UAVs from Australia for use their typhoon research program. Early attempts to acquire UAVs in 2005 were scrapped due to stricter air traffic controls imposed as a result of global terrorism.

References

2011 establishments in Taiwan
Research institutes in Taiwan
Environmental research institutes
Stormwater management
Environmental engineering
2018 disestablishments in Taiwan